Mob Girl: A Woman's Life in the Underworld is  1992 non-fiction book written by Teresa Carpenter about mafia informant and mob moll Arlyne Brickman.  It was published by Simon & Schuster.

References

External links
Mob Girl at TeresaCarpenter.com

1992 non-fiction books
English-language books
American non-fiction books
Non-fiction books about Italian-American organized crime
Works about the American Mafia